Skeet Ulrich (born Bryan Ray Trout on January 20, 1970) is an American actor. He is best known for his roles in popular 1990s films, including Billy Loomis in Scream (1996), Chris Hooker in The Craft (1996) and Vincent Lopiano in As Good as It Gets (1997). Since 2017, he has starred as Forsythe Pendleton "F.P." Jones II on The CW's Riverdale. He reprised his Scream role in the sequels Scream (2022) and Scream VI (2023). His other television roles include Johnston Jacob "Jake" Green Jr. in the television series Jericho, and LAPD Detective Rex Winters, a Marine veteran from the Law & Order franchise.

Early life
Bryan Ray Trout was born on January 20, 1970, in Lynchburg, Virginia. His mother, Carolyn Elaine Wax (née Rudd), owns the special events marketing agency Sports Management Group, and his father is a restaurateur. He has an elder brother, Geoff. His first stepfather was D. K. Ulrich, a NASCAR driver and team owner, whom he considers his father. In 1990, his mother remarried, to Edward Lewis Wax. Ulrich's maternal uncle is retired NASCAR driver Ricky Rudd, and his maternal grandfather was Alvin Ray Rudd Sr., the president of Al Rudd Auto Parts.

Ulrich's father kidnapped him and his brother when he was six years old, and they spent the next three years moving from Florida to New York and then to Pennsylvania. They were reunited with their mother in North Carolina, where his father disappeared from his life.

The nickname "Skeet" originated from "Skeeter", a nickname he was given by his Little League coach because of his small stature and because he was fast as a mosquito. Along with his slight frame, he had poor health as a child, including numerous bouts with pneumonia; he underwent open-heart surgery to repair a defective ventricle. Ulrich graduated from Northwest Cabarrus High School in North Carolina. After enrolling at the University of North Carolina at Wilmington to study marine biology, he switched to New York University, where he was noticed by playwright David Mamet.

Career
In his earliest screen appearances, Ulrich was an uncredited extra in films Weekend at Bernie's (1989) and Teenage Mutant Ninja Turtles (1990). After joining the Atlantic Theater Company as an apprentice, Ulrich performed with the group, which got him noticed by director Stacy Cochran. She cast him in a CBS Schoolbreak Special. With her help, he also received his first notable role on screen in 1996 as the loutish boyfriend of Winona Ryder in Boys. That same year, he also appeared in Kevin Spacey’s directorial debut Albino Alligator and The Craft alongside Robin Tunney and Neve Campbell. He was cast that same year to star alongside Campbell again in Wes Craven's hit slasher film Scream as Billy Loomis.

In 1997, he had a small role as an emotionally conflicted gay hustler in As Good as It Gets (along with fellow Scream actor Jamie Kennedy). He appeared in films like The Newton Boys (1998) and Chill Factor (1999). He starred as Juvenal, a young man with stigmata and healing powers in the Paul Schrader film Touch (1997), and he appeared in Ride with the Devil (1999), an American Civil War drama directed by Ang Lee. In 2000, he played computer hacker Kevin Mitnick in the film Takedown.

On television, Ulrich starred in the short-lived ABC series Miracles and appeared in TNT's multiple Emmy-nominated miniseries Into the West (2005 in the U.S., 2006 in the UK). Also in 2005, Ulrich acted with Keri Russell in the television film The Magic of Ordinary Days. He starred as Jake Green on the CBS post-apocalyptic drama Jericho, which premiered on September 20, 2006, and ended its run on March 25, 2008. The series was cancelled after its first season but was brought back due to fan outcry and support. Fans lobbied the studio, and the series was brought back for a shorted second season. 

Ulrich is a recurring guest voice actor on the Adult Swim animated stop-motion sketch comedy series Robot Chicken. In sketches based on G.I. Joe, Ulrich voices the character Duke. Ulrich guest-starred in three episodes of CSI: NY as a complex and disturbed killer. From 2017 to 2021, he starred as Forsythe Pendleton Jones II, the father of Jughead Jones, in Riverdale on The CW, loosely based on the Archie comic book series.

Ulrich appeared as Brian David Mitchell in the 2017 Lifetime film I Am Elizabeth Smart, based on the 2002 abduction and captivity of Elizabeth Smart. He also played Brice in the 2017 horror movie Escape Room.

In 2022, Ulrich reprises his role as Billy Loomis in the fifth film in the series, also titled Scream. He did so again in 2023 in Scream VI.

Personal life
In 1997, Ulrich married English actress Georgina Cates, whom he met at an Academy Awards party. Their wedding was a small ceremony held on their farmland in Madison County, Virginia, with only the preacher as a guest. They have twins, a daughter and son, born in 2001. Ulrich and Cates separated in 2004 and filed for divorce in 2005, citing irreconcilable differences.

He married actress Amelia Jackson-Gray in 2012, and they divorced in 2015. In 2016, Ulrich became engaged to Brazilian model Rose Costa, but the couple split in 2017.

He enjoys woodworking.

Filmography

Film

Television

Awards and nominations

References

External links

 
 

1970 births
Living people
20th-century American male actors
21st-century American male actors
Male actors from North Carolina
Male actors from Virginia
American male film actors
American male television actors
American male voice actors
New York University alumni
People from Lynchburg, Virginia
People from Concord, North Carolina
People with congenital heart defects